Laggard Island is a rocky island lying  southeast of Bonaparte Point, off the southwest coast of Anvers Island in the Palmer Archipelago. Laggard Island was named by the United Kingdom Antarctic Place-names Committee (UK-APC) following a 1955 survey by the Falkland Islands Dependencies Survey (FIDS). The name arose from the island's position on the eastern fringe of the islands in the vicinity of Arthur Harbor.

See also 
 Composite Antarctic Gazetteer
 List of Antarctic and sub-Antarctic islands
 List of Antarctic islands south of 60° S
 SCAR
 Territorial claims in Antarctica

References

External links

Islands of the Palmer Archipelago